Jiří Novák and David Rikl were the defending champions but did not compete that year.

Gustavo Kuerten and Fernando Meligeni won in the final 6–4, 6–2 against Dinu Pescariu and Albert Portas.

Seeds

  Pablo Albano /  Lucas Arnold (quarterfinals)
  Rikard Bergh /  Greg Van Emburgh (quarterfinals)
  Gábor Köves /  Daniel Orsanic (semifinals)
  Nicolás Lapentti /  Fabrice Santoro (quarterfinals)

Draw

References
 1996 Hellmann's Cup Doubles Draw

1994 Doubles
1996 ATP Tour